On Tuesday, 11 December 2018, a gunman opened fire in the Metropolitan Cathedral in the Brazilian city of Campinas, São Paulo, killing five people and wounding four more. The event was reported by multiple news outlets.

Incident 
The shooter entered the cathedral around 13:25 local time (15:25 GMT). The officiating priest had left the cathedral prior to the attack and the suspect was not recognized by any of the church officials. The suspect entered the church while the Mass was still underway and sat in the back and watched the service for a while, before he began to fire his weapon. He killed four worshippers and injured another four. Police in the plaza outside of the church responded to the gunshots, and the gunman was hit in the side by police, before he committed suicide.

One day after the massacre, another victim had succumbed to his injuries at the hospital, and the fifth victim of this massacre was revealed, Heleno Severo Alves, 84 years old.

The incident was documented on the surveillance footage from inside the cathedral and allowed the police to review the timeline of the incident.

The victims
The five victims of the massacre were all men between the ages of 38 and 84. The five victims of the massacre are (in order of age):
 Cristofer Gonçalves dos Santos - 38 years old;
 Sidnei Vitor Monteiro - 39 years old (Note: Sidnei's mother was injured in the massacre);
 Elpídio Alves Coutinho - 67 years old; 
 José Eudes Gonzaga Ferreira - 68 years old and;
 Heleno Severo Alves - 84 years old (Note: Heleno was a resident of Indaiatuba, a city close to Campinas).

Suspect 
Police released the name of the perpetrator as Euler Fernando Grandolpho, a 49-year-old systems analyst with no known criminal record.

Aftermath 
A Mass was held in the Cathedral the day after the incident to honor the victims with Father Rafael Capelato stating; "We know that you, family members, are crying - and so are we."

Campinas Mayor Jonas Donizetti declared three days of mourning in the city and used Twitter to express his condolences and horror about the crime.

See also 
Campinas massacre (31 December 2016)
Rio de Janeiro school shooting (7 April 2011)
2018 Strasbourg attack (11 December 2018), an unrelated attack which happened on the same day

References 

2018 in Brazil
2018 mass shootings in South America
Attacks on buildings and structures in Brazil
Attacks on churches in South America
Campinas
Deaths by firearm in Brazil
December 2018 crimes in South America
December 2018 events in South America
Filmed killings
Mass murder in 2018
Mass murder in Brazil
Mass shootings in Brazil
Murder–suicides in Brazil
Suicides by firearm in Brazil
2018 murders in Brazil